Mari-Doris Vartmann (born 25 December 1988) is a German pair skater. With Ruben Blommaert, she won four ISU Challenger Series medals. With Aaron Van Cleave, she is the 2015 German national champion, the 2011 NRW Trophy champion, and 2010 Warsaw Cup champion.

Personal life 
Vartmann was born on 25 December 1988 in Neuss, West Germany. She is of German and Japanese descent.

Career

Early career
Vartmann started skating at the age of five in her home town of Neuss. Four years later she moved to the Düsseldorfer club. In January 2004, she turned to pair skating and was partnered with Florian Just. The pair was coached by Knut Schubert mainly in Dortmund.

Vartmann/Just became three-time German national medalists and appeared at four ISU Championships, finishing 18th at the 2006 Worlds in Calgary, Alberta, Canada; 7th at the 2007 Europeans in Warsaw, Poland; 18th at the 2007 Worlds in Tokyo, Japan; and 7th at the 2008 Europeans in Zagreb, Croatia. They parted ways just after the 2009 NRW Trophy.

Partnership with Van Cleave 
In 2010, Vartmann teamed up with Canadian-American skater Aaron Van Cleave to compete for Germany. The pair made their international debut at the 2010 Warsaw Cup where they won the gold medal. Their first major international event was the 2012 European Championships. On 26 January, during the morning practice before the long programs, Vartmann collided with Daniel Wende while they were attempting to avoid a French couple. Vartmann and Van Cleave finished 5th at the event. They were coached by Knut Schubert in Berlin.

Vartmann and Van Cleave withdrew from the 2012 Nebelhorn Trophy following the short program – Vartmann picked into her right foot when she fell on a throw triple loop during the short and was unable to put on her skate the next day due to swelling. They withdrew from the 2012 Coupe de Nice and their first assigned Grand Prix event, the 2012 Cup of Russia, after Van Cleave sustained a broken cheekbone while catching Vartmann on a triple twist. They later withdrew from their second GP, the 2012 NHK Trophy.

The pair was coached by Knut Schubert and Stefan Lindemann in Berlin in the first half of the 2014–15 season. In December 2014, they joined Maylin Wende and Daniel Wende in Oberstdorf. They won the pairs title at the 2015 German Championships.

Partnership with Blommaert 
In the 2015–16 season, Vartmann started skating with Ruben Blommaert. They won the 2015 Cup of Nice. At the 2016 Europeans they placed 4th in the short program, 8th in the free program and 8th overall.

Vartmann and Blommaert started the 2016–17 season on the Challenger Series, winning bronze at both Nebelhorn Trophy and Finlandia Trophy. On 10 January 2017, the Deutsche Eislauf-Union announced that their partnership had come to an end.

Partnership with Landgraf 
On 22 February 2017, German media announced that Vartmann would compete with Matti Landgraf, a German skater whose cruise ship contract ran until the end of March 2017. Daniel Wende would coach the pair in Oberstdorf.

Programs

With Blommaert

With Van Cleave

With Just

Competitive highlights 
GP: Grand Prix; CS: Challenger Series

Pairs with Blommaert

Pairs with Van Cleave

Pairs with Just

Ladies' singles

References

External links

 
 Vartmann-Just-Homepage

1988 births
Living people
Sportspeople from Neuss
German female single skaters
German female pair skaters
German people of Japanese descent
21st-century German women